Round Lake is a natural lake in Clark County, South Dakota, in the United States. The lake is found at an elevation of 

Round Lake received its name on account of its round outline.

See also
List of lakes in South Dakota

References

Lakes of South Dakota
Lakes of Clark County, South Dakota